McLaren Smith (born 31 August 1991) is a cricketer who has played one One Day International for Bermuda.

He was a late inclusion in the Bermuda squad ahead of the 2008 Under-19 Cricket World Cup, replacing injured Lamar Richardson. In the same year, he made his One Day International debut for Bermuda's senior team against Canada, at the age of 16. He bowled only two overs without taking a wicket, and this was his only ODI match of career. He replaced Richardson in the Bermuda squad for the Stanford 20/20 tournament held later in the year, but did not play any match.

External links

References 

1991 births
Living people
Bermuda One Day International cricketers
Bermudian cricketers